Imma mesochorda is a moth in the family Immidae. It was described by Edward Meyrick in 1906. It is found in Assam, India.

The wingspan is 15–16 mm. The forewings are dark fuscous with a slender rather irregular light ochreous-yellow slightly curved fascia from the middle of the costa to two-thirds of the dorsum, but not quite reaching the dorsal edge, constricted beneath the costa. The hindwings are dark fuscous, lighter towards the base.

References.

Moths described in 1906
Immidae
Moths of Asia